General elections were held in Jamaica on 9 February 1989. The result was a victory for the People's National Party, which won 45 of the 60 seats. Voter turnout was 78.4%.

They were the first seriously contested elections since 1980, as the PNP had boycotted the 1983 snap elections to protest the refusal of the ruling Jamaican Labour Party to update the electoral roll amid allegations of voter fraud.

Prime Minister Edward Seaga announced the election date on 15 January at a rally in Kingston, with the emergency conditions caused by Hurricane Gilbert in 1988 forcing an extension of the parliamentary term beyond its normal five-year mandate.

Campaign
The election date and tone of the election were shaped in part by Hurricane Gilbert, which made landfall in September 1988 and decimated the island. The hurricane caused almost $1 billion worth of damage to the island, with banana and coffee crops wiped out and thousands of homes destroyed. Both parties engaged in campaigning through the distribution of relief supplies, a hallmark of the Jamaican patronage system. Political commentators noted that prior to the hurricane, Edward Seaga and the JLP trailed Michael Manley and the PNP by twenty points in opinion polls. The ability to provide relief as the party in charge allowed Seaga to improve his standing among voters and erode the inevitability of Manley's victory. However, scandals related to the relief effort cost Seaga and the JLP some of the gains made immediately following the hurricane. Scandals that emerged included National Security Minister Errol Anderson personally controlling a warehouse full of disaster relief supplies and candidate Joan Gordon-Webley distributing American-donated flour in sacks with her picture on them.

The election was characterized by a narrower ideological difference between the two parties on economic issues. Michael Manley facilitated his comeback campaign by moderating his leftist positions and admitting mistakes made as Prime Minister, saying he erred when he involved government in economic production and had abandoned all thoughts of nationalizing industry. He cited the PNP's desire to continue the market-oriented policies of the JLP government, but with a more participatory approach. Prime Minister Edward Seaga ran on his record of economic growth and the reduction of unemployment in Jamaica, using the campaign slogan "Don't Let Them Wreck It Again" to refer to Manley's tenure as Prime Minister. Seaga during his tenure as Prime Minister emphasized the need to tighten public sector spending and cut close to 27,000 public sector jobs in 1983 and 1984. He shifted his plans as elections neared with a promise to spend J$1 billion on a five-year Social Well-Being Programme, which would build new hospitals and schools in Jamaica.

Foreign policy also played a role in the 1989 election. Prime Minister Edward Seaga emphasized his relations with the United States, a relationship which saw Jamaica receiving considerable economic aid from the U.S and additional loans from international institutions. Manley pledged better relations with the United States while at the same time pledging to restore diplomatic relations with Cuba that had been cut under Seaga. With Manley as Prime Minister, Jamaican-American relations had significantly frayed as a result of Manley's economic policies and close relations with Cuba.

The personalities of the two party leaders helped shape the 1989 campaign. While Seaga was portrayed as a good manager with a cold public demeanor, Manley was perceived as a person with suspect managerial skills but exceptional personal magnetism. Seaga summarized the two personalities by saying, "Some people prefer to have a husband who will provide for them and give them security. Others are looking for a lover to give them joy."

Results

By constituency

References

General
Elections in Jamaica
Jamaica